Orwell Dam (National ID # MN00574) is a dam in Otter Tail County, Minnesota, about six miles southwest of Fergus Falls.

The earthen gravity dam was constructed in 1953 by the United States Army Corps of Engineers, with a height of 60 feet and a length of 1355 feet at its crest.  It impounds the Otter Tail River for flood control, irrigation water storage, and municipal drinking water.  The dam is owned and operated by the St. Paul District, Mississippi Valley Division, Corps of Engineers.

The reservoir it creates, Orwell Lake, has a normal water surface of 1.3 square miles, with a maximum capacity of 20,600 acre-feet.  Recreation includes hunting, boating, and fishing (for walleye, northern, crappie and redhorse sucker).

References 

Dams in Minnesota
Reservoirs in Minnesota
United States Army Corps of Engineers dams
Buildings and structures in Otter Tail County, Minnesota
Dams completed in 1953
Lakes of Otter Tail County, Minnesota